The 1989 European Weightlifting Championships were held in Athens, Greece from September 16 to September 23, 1989. This was the 68th edition of the event. There were 136 men in action from 23 nations. This tournament was a part of 1989 World Weightlifting Championships. The women competition were held in Manchester, United Kingdom. It was the 2nd event for the women.

Medal summary

Men

Women
https://pl.wikipedia.org/wiki/Mistrzostwa_Europy_Kobiet_w_Podnoszeniu_Ci%C4%99%C5%BCar%C3%B3w_1989

Medal table
Ranking by Big (Total result) medals

References
Results (Chidlovski.net)
 Панорама спортивного года 1989 / Сост. Ю. С. Лукашин — М.: «Физкультура и спорт», 1990. 

European Weightlifting Championships
European Weightlifting Championships
European Weightlifting Championships
International weightlifting competitions hosted by Greece
Sports competitions in Athens